Sabine Wichert (8 June 1942 – 8 September 2014), was a German born poet and historian from Northern Ireland

Biography

Born Sabine Wichert on 8 June 1942 in Graudenz, West Prussia which is now Grudziadz, Poland, Wichert was educated in West Germany. She studied in Frankfurt, Marburg, FU Berlin and Mannheim. She also studied in Britain in the London school of Economics and Oxford. Her first introduction to Belfast was a visit to the city as a tourist.

She worked in Queen's University, Belfast from 1971 teaching history but with an interest in the visual arts. She wrote poetry about her adopted homeland and edited the work of historian ATQ Stewart. She retired in 2007. She died of lung cancer in Belfast on 8 September 2014. Wichert was cremated at Roselawn and was returned to Germany by her brothers Peter and Christian.

She was a member of the Arts Council of Northern Ireland until 1994 and she was appointed to the Board of Annaghmakerrig by the Arts Councils in Ireland.

Bibliography

Poetry

 Miranda (1993)
 Tin Drum Country (1995) 
 Sharing Darwin (1999)
 Taganrog (2004)

Non fiction

 Northern Ireland Since 1945
 The British Left and Appeasement: Political Tactics or Alternative Policies?
 The Northern Ireland Conflict: New Wine in Old Bottles?
 The role of nationalism in the Northern Ireland conflict
 Northern Ireland: The Context for Conflict and for Reconciliation

References and sources

1942 births
2014 deaths
People from Grudziądz
German emigrants to Northern Ireland
Writers from Belfast
20th-century poets from Northern Ireland
21st-century poets from Northern Ireland
Historians from Northern Ireland
Alumni of the London School of Economics
Academics of Queen's University Belfast
Deaths from lung cancer in Northern Ireland
20th-century women writers from Northern Ireland
21st-century women writers from Northern Ireland